Idrissa Camará (born 20 July 1993) is a Guinea-Bissauan international footballer who plays for Italian club Mazara, as a winger.

Club career
Born in Bissau, Camará has played club football for Étoile Lusitana, Chaves, Visé and Correggese. On 1 July 2016 he signed for Serie B team Avellino. In January 2018 he moved on loan to Akragas.

In July 2022, he signed for Eccellenza Sicily club Mazara.

International career
He made his international debut for Guinea-Bissau in 2010.

International goals
Scores and results list Guinea-Bissau's goal tally first.

References

1993 births
Living people
Bissau-Guinean footballers
Guinea-Bissau international footballers
Étoile Lusitana players
G.D. Chaves players
C.S. Visé players
S.S.D. Correggese Calcio 1948 players
U.S. Avellino 1912 players
S.S. Akragas Città dei Templi players
S.S.D. Varese Calcio players
Challenger Pro League players
Belgian Third Division players
Serie D players
Serie B players
Serie C players
Association football wingers
Bissau-Guinean expatriate footballers
Bissau-Guinean expatriate sportspeople in Senegal
Expatriate footballers in Senegal
Bissau-Guinean expatriate sportspeople in Portugal
Expatriate footballers in Portugal
Bissau-Guinean expatriate sportspeople in Belgium
Expatriate footballers in Belgium
Bissau-Guinean expatriate sportspeople in Italy
Expatriate footballers in Italy
2017 Africa Cup of Nations players
U.S. Agropoli 1921 players